Patriarch Alexy of Moscow may refer to:

 Patriarch Alexy I of Moscow and All Russia (1877–1970), ruled in 1945–1970
 Patriarch Alexy II of Moscow and All Russia (1928–2008), ruled in 1990–2008

See also
 Alexius, Metropolitan of Moscow (–1378)

Title and name disambiguation pages